The Kenya Freedom Party was a political party in Kenya.

History
The Kenya Freedom Party was established in February 1960 by Indians including Chanan Singh who felt that the Kenya Indian Congress (KIC) was no sufficiently supportive of independence. 

Calling for immediate independence and universal suffrage, in the 1961 general elections it received 0.6% of the vote, winning two of the 53 elected seats in the Legislative Council, whilst the KIC won three seats.

The party allied itself with the Kenya African National Union, and merged into it in 1963.

References

Defunct political parties in Kenya
1960 establishments in Kenya
Political parties established in 1960
1962 disestablishments in Kenya
Political parties disestablished in 1962
Indian diaspora in Kenya